Ilvese  is a village in Saarde Parish, Pärnu County in southwestern Estonia. Prior to the administrative reform of local governments in 2017, the village was part of Surju Parish.

References

 

Villages in Pärnu County